Inga subnuda is a species of plant in the family Fabaceae. It is found in Brazil and Venezuela.

References

External links

subnuda